Joel W. Pett (born September 1, 1953) is an American Pulitzer Prize-winning editorial cartoonist for the Lexington Herald-Leader. His cartoons are syndicated by Tribune Content Agency.

Early life and career
Pett was born in Bloomington, Indiana. He moved to Ibadan, Nigeria with his family in 1959 before returning to America in 1964.

After college at Indiana University, he began doing freelance cartooning jobs for over nine years. In April 1984, he joined the Lexington Herald-Leader as their staff cartoonist.

Pett's cartoons have appeared in hundreds of newspapers and magazines nationwide, including the Washington Post, the New York Times, the Los Angeles Times, and the Boston Globe. He is a weekly contributor to USA Today, writes a regular feature on cartoons for the Los Angeles Times, and does a monthly cartoon for the educational journal Phi Delta Kappan.

Mr. Pett also received the 1999 Robert F. Kennedy Journalism Award for cartoons highlighting the plight of the disadvantaged, and the 1995 Global Media Award for cartoons on population issues. He is a past president of the Association of American Editorial Cartoonists, and a past Pulitzer juror. He has conducted three overseas seminars on editorial cartooning as a guest speaker of the U.S. State Department.

What if it's a big hoax and we create a better world for nothing? cartoon

Pett is perhaps best known for his cartoon featuring an attendee at a climate summit asking What if it's a big hoax and we create a better world for nothing?. The cartoon, which first appeared in USA Today in December 2009,  around the time of the 2009 United Nations Climate Change Conference, depicts a conference presenter listing the many advantages of curbing climate change including "energy independence, preserving rainforests, sustainability, green jobs, livable cities, renewables, clean water/air, healthy children, etc., etc.," only to have a climate change denier interject that if it were all a hoax, we'd create a "better world for nothing".  Shortly after the conference was over, Pett got a request for a signed copy from then-EPA administrator Lisa P. Jackson, who framed the comic and put it on her wall. Pett has repeatedly gotten requests from over 40 environmental groups, in the United States, Canada and Europe to use the cartoon in campaigns. The Australian Greens used it in a campaign which some have claimed was influential in the Australian parliament adopting a carbon pricing scheme under the Clean Energy Act 2011, said to be the most rigorous scheme in the world for the time it was active.

"I've drawn 7,000 cartoons in my life, but really only one," Pett said. "It's an example of one of these ideas I had in my head for 10 years before I realized I hadn't cartooned it...I was thinking, you know, 'It doesn't matter if global warming were a hoax, if the scientists made it up, we still have to do all that shit.'" Pett said in a 2012 editorial that in the 27 months since its first publication, not a week had gone by where he didn't have a request to use the image.

Awards
Pett was a finalist for the Pulitzer Prize for Editorial Cartooning in 1989 and 1998 before winning in 2000. Pett is also the winner of the 1999 Robert F. Kennedy Journalism Award for cartooning, and a 1995 winner of the Global Media Award for cartoons on population issues.

References

External links

 AAEC Bio

1953 births
Living people
American editorial cartoonists
Pulitzer Prize for Editorial Cartooning winners
Presidents of the Association of American Editorial Cartoonists